The Classical Association is a British learned society in the field of classics, aimed at developing classical study and promoting its importance in education.

Constitution
The association was founded on 19 December 1903, and its objects are defined in its constitution as:

 The advancement of education by the promotion, development and maintenance of classical studies
 To increase public awareness of the contribution and importance of classics to education and public life.

It was founded with the name "The Classical Association of England and Wales" but the name was changed to "The Classical Association" in 1907.

The Association is a registered charity.

Publications
The Association publishes three journals: The Classical Review, The Classical Quarterly and Greece & Rome, and a newspaper Classical Association News (sometimes abbreviated to CA News). Its other activities include work with schools, conferences, and the award of grants. The association celebrated its centenary in 2003 by publishing a book, The Classical Association: the First Century 1903–2003, edited by Dr Christopher Stray; this includes a history of the association and studies of various aspects of its activities over the century, including an account of the Classical Association of Scotland.

Following the merger of the Joint Association of Classical Teachers into the Classical Association in 2015, the Classical Association took over publication of JACT's journals, the Journal of Classics Teaching (which went online only) and Omnibus.

List of presidents

Sir Richard Henn Collins (1903– )
Lord Halsbury (1905-6)
Lord Curzon (1906–7)
S. H. Butcher (1907-8)
H. H. Asquith (1908–9)
Evelyn Baring, 1st Earl of Cromer (1909–10)
Sir Archibald Geikie (1910–11)
Edward Hicks (1911–12)
Henry Montague Butler (1912–13)
Frederic Kenyon (1913–14)
William Ridgeway (1914–15)
Sir William Richmond (1915–16)
James Bryce, Viscount Bryce (1916–17)
Gilbert Murray (1917–18)
Henry Fisher (1918–19)
Sir William Osler (1919– )
Walter Leaf (1921– )
Alfred, 1st Viscount Milner (1921–22)
John William Mackail (1923–4)
Robert Crewe-Milnes, Marquess of Crewe (1923–24)
John Percival Postgate (1925–6)
Stanley Baldwin (1925-26–)
Gordon, Viscount Hewart (1926–27)
Robert Seymour Conway (1927–28)
D'Arcy Wentworth Thompson (1928–29)
William Temple, Archbishop of York (1929–30)
Albert Curtis Clark (1930–31)
William David Ross (1932)
Sir George Macdonald (1932– )
William Inge (1933–34)
Cyril Bailey (1934–35)
Leo Amery (1935–36)
Terrot Reaveley Glover (1937–38)
Sir Stephen Gaselee (diplomat) (1940–1)
Sir Richard Livingstone (1941–2)
T. S. Eliot (1942–3)
John Sheppard (1943– )
Maurice Bowra (1945– )
Sir Frank Adcock (1948–9)
Lord Soulbury (1949– )
Harold Nicolson (1951–2)
William Calder (1952–3)
Lord Samuel (1953–4)
Gilbert Murray (1954–5)
Dr G. M. Young (1955–6)
Sir Harold Iaris Bell (1956–7)
John Spedan Lewis (1957–8)
Dorothy Tarrant (1958–9)
Sir Cyril Hinshelwood (1959– )
Lord Hailsham (1961–2)
William Beare (1962–3)
Professor E. R. Dodds (1963–4)
Sir Basil Blackwell (1964–5)
Professor Sir Roger Mynors (1965–6)
Dilys Powell (1966–7)
Professor W. K. C. Guthrie (1967–8)
Montague Woodhouse (1968–9)
Professor F. W. Walbank (1969–70)
Sir John Hackett (1970–1)
Patrick Wilkinson (1971–2)
Lord Boyle of Handsworth (1972–3)
Professor Moses Finley (1973–4)
Dom David Knowles (1974–5)
Professor Kenneth Dover (1975–6)
Professor David Daube (1976–7)
Dr Michael Grant (author) (1977–8)
Professor Brinley Rees (1978–9)
Lord Wolfenden (1979–80)
Professor R. D. Williams (1980–1)
Sir David Hunt (1981–2)
Professor E. J. Kenney (1982–3)
Professor Raymond Williams (1983–4)
Professor Eric Handley (1984–5)
Sir Nicholas Goodison (1985–6)
Professor Norma Miller (1986–7)
Tony Harrison (1987–8)
Professor Patricia Easterling (1988–9)
Sir Jeremy Morse (1989–90)
Professor George Kerferd (1990–1)
Lord Robert Runcie (1991–2)
Professor Fergus Millar (1992–3)
Colin Haycraft (1993–4)
Professor David West (1994–5)
Anthony Cleaver (1995–6)
Carol Handley (1996–7)
Lindsey Davis, historical novelist (1997–8)
Professor Oliver Taplin (1998–9)
Emma Kirkby (1999–2000)
Professor Peter Wiseman (2000–1)
Philip Howard (2001–2)
Dr Peter Jones (classicist) (2002–3)
Susan Greenfield, Baroness Greenfield (2003–4)
Professor Malcolm Schofield (2006–7)
Robert Harris (2007–8)
Professor Richard Seaford (2008–9)
Dr Richard Stoneman (2009–10)
Professor Christopher Rowe (2010–11)
Sir Peter Stothard (2011–12) 
Professor Robin Osborne (2012–13)
Martha Kearney (2013–14)
Professor P. J. Rhodes (2014–15).
Professor Robert Crawford (2015–16)
Professor Robert Fowler (2016–17)
Dame Professor Mary Beard (2017–18)
 Mari Williams (2020–)

References

Further reading
 
 Philip Hooker, The Presidents, Greece & Rome Vol. 50, The Classical Association: The First Century 1903-2003 pp. 183–190
The Manchester and District Branch of the Classical Association, 1904 - 2004. Manchester: Manchester and District Branch of the Classical Association, 2004

External links

Classical associations and societies
Education in Hertfordshire
1903 establishments in the United Kingdom
Learned societies of the United Kingdom
Organisations based in Hertfordshire
Organizations established in 1903
Rickmansworth